Vernonia amoena is a species of annual, flowering plant in the aster family, Asteraceae. It is endemic to Zambia and Zimbabwe. The flowers may be blueish purple or white.

References

amoena
Flora of Zambia
Flora of Zimbabwe